The CWF Mid-Atlantic Rising Generation League Championship is a professional wrestling secondary championship in Carolina Wrestling Federation Mid-Atlantic (CWF Mid-Atlantic). It was first introduced by the promotion while an affiliate of the Frontier Wrestling Alliance (2001-2004) and later recognized by AWA Superstars (2005-2007). The title is traditionally defended in an annual tournament, typically held in December, although it has been occasionally defended in singles matches during the year. The title has switched hands in non-tournament bouts only twice, with the majority of the title changes occurring at the  Rising Generation League Tournament. As of 2012, no champion has ever won the tournament more than once.

The inaugural champion was The Kamakazi Kid, who defeated Brass Munkey in a tournament final on December 12, 2002 to become the first FWA-Carolinas Rising Generation League Champion. The Kamakazi Kid and Ultra Dragon both hold the record for longest title reign at 378 days each. The Kamakazi Kid's first reign is considered one of the longest championship reigns in the promotion's history. Roo D. Lewis' only reign was the shortest in the history of the title lasting only 76 days. Overall, there have been 12 reigns shared between 12 wrestlers, with two vacancies.

Title history

Combined reigns

References
General

Specific

External links

CWF Mid-Atlantic Rising Generation League Title at Genickbruch.com
 CWF Mid-Atlantic Rising Generation League Championship

CWF Mid-Atlantic championships
Heavyweight wrestling championships
United States regional professional wrestling championships